Luteibacter rhizovicinus is a Gram-negative, aerobic, chemoorganotrophic and motile bacterium from the genus of Luteibacter with a polar flagellum which has been isolated from rhizospheric soil of the plant Hordeum vulgare from Taastrop in Denmark.

References

Xanthomonadales
Bacteria described in 2005